The Office for Strategic Planning of the Central Military Commission  is the chief organ under the Central Military Commission of the People's Republic of China. It was founded on January 11, 2016, under Xi Jinping's military reforms.

Its current director is Wang Huiqing.

References

See also 

 Central Military Commission (China)

Central Military Commission (China)
2016 establishments in China